Phillips's gerbil (Gerbilliscus phillipsi) is a species of rodent found in Ethiopia, Kenya, and Somalia. Its natural habitat is subtropical or tropical dry shrubland.

References

Gerbilliscus
Mammals described in 1898
Taxonomy articles created by Polbot